Xylomeira is a genus of horned powder-post beetles in the family Bostrichidae. There is one described species in Xylomeira, X. tridens.

References

Further reading

External links

 

Bostrichidae
Articles created by Qbugbot